"Alocao" is a song by Spanish singers Omar Montes and Bad Gyal. It was released as a single by Universal Music Group on 24 October 2019. The song debuted at number one in Spain, becoming Montes' and Bad Gyal's first number-one song in the country.

Critical reception
Shaad D'Souza of The Fader described the track as a "a fiery new collaboration" and highlighted Bad Gyal's "dexterous sing-rapping". Skope at Skopemag thought the song was "a beat-driven beauty that’s both irresistibly sexy and heartrendingly melancholy with powerful threads of longing and desire".

Music video
The music video was released on 24 October 2019, and it was directed by Fabricio Jiménez. It was shot in Girona, Spain. It shows the singers dancing intimately with each other and features shots of a mansion and a Lamborghini. Bad Gyal is seen wearing different hair styles, both blonde and orange.

Charts

Weekly charts

Year-end charts

Certifications

References

2019 singles
2019 songs
Bad Gyal songs
Male–female vocal duets
Music videos shot in Spain
Number-one singles in Spain
Spanish-language songs
Universal Music Group singles